Alice Geraldine Farrar (February 28, 1882 – March 11, 1967) was an American lyric soprano who could also sing dramatic roles. She was noted for her beauty, acting ability, and "the intimate timbre of her voice." She had a large following among young women, who were nicknamed "Gerry-flappers".

Biography
Farrar was born in Melrose, Massachusetts, the daughter of baseball player Sidney Farrar, and his wife Henrietta Barnes. At age five, she began studying music in Boston and by 14 was giving recitals. Later she studied voice with the American soprano Emma Thursby in New York City, in Paris, and finally with the Italian baritone Francesco Graziani in Berlin. Farrar created a sensation at the Berlin Hofoper with her debut as Marguerite in Charles Gounod's Faust in 1901 and remained with the company for three years, during which time she continued her studies with famed German soprano Lilli Lehmann. (She had been recommended to Lehmann by another famous soprano of the previous generation, Lillian Nordica.) She appeared in the title roles of Ambroise Thomas' Mignon and Jules Massenet's Manon, as well as Juliette in Gounod's Roméo et Juliette. Her admirers in Berlin included Crown Prince Wilhelm of Germany, with whom she is believed to have had a relationship beginning in 1903.

After three years with the Monte Carlo Opera, Farrar made her debut at the New York Metropolitan Opera in Roméo et Juliette on November 26, 1906. She appeared in the first Met performance of Giacomo Puccini's Madama Butterfly in 1907 and remained a member of the company until her retirement in 1922, singing 29 roles there in 672 performances. She developed a great popular following, especially among New York's young female opera-goers, who were known as "Gerry-flappers". Farrar created the title roles in Pietro Mascagni's Amica (Monte Carlo, 1905), Puccini's Suor Angelica (New York City, 1918), Umberto Giordano's Madame Sans-Gêne (New York, 1915), as well as the Goosegirl in Engelbert Humperdinck's Königskinder (New York, 1910), for which Farrar trained her own flock of geese. According to a review in the New York Tribune of the first performance, "at the close of the opera Miss Farrar caused 'much amusement' by appearing before the curtain with a live goose under her arm."

Farrar recorded extensively for the Victor Talking Machine Company and was often featured prominently in that firm's advertisements. She also appeared in silent films, which were produced between opera seasons. Farrar starred in more than a dozen films from 1915 to 1920, including Cecil B. De Mille's 1915 adaptation of Georges Bizet's opera Carmen, for which she was extensively praised. "The resolution of Geraldine Farrar, the beautiful and gifted star, to employ her talents in the attaining of success in the films is one of the greatest steps in advancing the dignity of the motion pictures. Miss Farrar's 'Carmen' in the films is the greatest triumph the motion picture has yet achieved over the speaking stage," claimed the San Francisco Call & Post. For her performance, she came in fourth place in the 1916 "Screen Masterpiece" contest held by Motion Picture Magazine. Theda Bara's performance of the same role received 9,150 votes. One of her other notable screen roles was as Joan of Arc in the 1917 film Joan the Woman. In June 1931, Farrar made her debut radio broadcast over the National Broadcasting Company's nationwide "Red" network.

According to her biographer:

In 1960, Farrar was awarded two stars on the Hollywood Walk of Fame, in the music and film categories, located at 1620 and 1709 Vine Street.

Personal life

Beginning in 1908, Farrar had a seven-year love affair with the  Italian conductor Arturo Toscanini. Her ultimatum, that he leave his wife and children and marry her, resulted in Toscanini's abrupt resignation as principal conductor of the Metropolitan Opera in 1915. Farrar was a close friend to the Met's star tenor Enrico Caruso and there has been speculation that they too had a love affair. It is said that Caruso coined her motto: Farrar farà ("Farrar will do it").

Her marriage to actor Lou Tellegen on February 8, 1916 was the source of considerable scandal. The marriage ended, as a result of her husband's numerous affairs, in a very public divorce in 1923. The circumstances of the divorce were brought again to public recollection by Tellegen's bizarre 1934 suicide in Hollywood. Farrar reportedly said "Why should that interest me?" when told of Tellegen's death.

Farrar retired from opera in 1922 at the age of 40. Her final performance was as Leoncavallo's Zazà. By this stage, her voice was in premature decline due to overwork. According to the American music critic Henry Pleasants, the author of The Great Singers from the Dawn of Opera to Our Own Time (first published 1967), she gave between 25 and 35 performances each season at the Met alone. They included 95 appearances as Madama Butterfly and 58 as Carmen in 16 seasons. The title role in Puccini's Tosca, which she had added to her repertoire in 1909, was another one of her favourite Met parts.

Farrar quickly transitioned into concert recitals, and was signed (within several weeks of announcing her opera retirement) to an appearance at Hershey Park on Memorial Day 1922. She continued to make recordings and give recitals throughout the 1920s and was briefly the intermission commentator for the Metropolitan Opera radio broadcasts during the 1934–35 season. Her unusual autobiography, Such Sweet Compulsion, published in 1938, was written in alternating chapters purporting to be her own words and those of her deceased mother, with Mrs. Farrar rather floridly recounting her daughter's many accomplishments.

In 1967, Farrar died in Ridgefield, Connecticut of heart disease aged 85, and was buried in Kensico Cemetery in Valhalla, New York. She had no children.

Filmography

Media

In popular culture
The American author Barbara Paul has written several murder mystery novels featuring Geraldine Farrar, Enrico Caruso, and the Metropolitan Opera.

References

Citations

General sources 
 
 
 
 Rosenthal, H. and Warrack, J., "Farrar, Geraldine", The Concise Oxford Dictionary of Opera, 2nd Edition, Oxford University Press, 1979, p. 161. .

External links

 
 
 
  Geraldine Farrar and tenor Enrico Caruso sing Giacomo Puccini's Vogliatemi bene from Madama Butterfly
 Geraldine Farrar recordings at the Discography of American Historical Recordings.
 Geraldine Farrar Collection, 1895-1943 at the Library of Congress
 Geraldine Farrar Memorabilia  at the Newberry Library
 Geraldine Farrar at Virtual History
 Geraldine Farrar photo gallery (Univ. of Washington/Sayre Collection)
 The Story of My Life (Chapter 1) published in Photoplay, February 1919
 The Story of My Life (Chapter 2) published in Photoplay, March 1919
 The Story of My Life (Chapter 3) published in Photoplay, April 1919

1882 births
1967 deaths
20th-century American actresses
American film actresses
American operatic sopranos
American silent film actresses
Burials at Kensico Cemetery
People from Melrose, Massachusetts
Writers from Massachusetts
20th-century American singers
20th-century American women singers
Victor Records artists